Negrești-Oaș  is a town in northwestern Romania, in the county of Satu Mare. Two villages, Luna (Lunaforrás) and Tur (Túrvékonya), are administered by the town. The name Negrești comes from the Romanian word "negru", meaning "black". The town is the  capital of the Oaș Country ethnographic region.

Geography
Negrești-Oaș is located in the northeastern part of the county, on the border with Maramureș County, near the Ukrainian border.

The town is traversed by national road , which starts in Oradea, runs through Carei, Satu Mare, and Negrești-Oaș, then crosses the Inner Eastern Carpathians at the Huta Pass, and ends in Sighetu Marmației.

Population

According to the 2011 census, there were 11,867 people living within the town.

Of the population for whom data were available, 95% were ethnic Romanians, while 2.9% were ethnic Hungarians and 1.9% Roma. 72.4% were Romanian Orthodox, 12.6% Jehovah's Witnesses, 4.5% Pentecostal, 3.7% Roman Catholic, 3.4% Greek-Catholic and 1.6% Reformed.

Natives
 Oana Gregory (born 1996), actress
 Mihai Ștețca (born 1981), footballer

Gallery

References

Towns in Romania
Populated places in Satu Mare County